Meyers is a common surname, and may also refer to:

Meyers may also refer to:

Characters 
 Professor Alex Meyers, character played by Christine Taylor in "The Professor", a 2006 episode of the TV series My Name Is Earl
 Mort Meyers, recurring character in the TV series Arrested Development played by Jeff Garlin
 Roger Meyers, Jr., recurring character in the American animated TV series The Simpsons
 Takuto Meyers (タクト マイヤーズ, Takuto Maiyaazu), protagonist of the manga and video-game series Galaxy Angel
 Leslie Meyers, character in the American animated TV series South Park

Places 
 Meyers, California, in El Dorado County
 Meyers Chuck, Alaska, USA, census-designated place
 Meyers Corners, hamlet in the town of Bethlehem, New York, USA
 Meyers Lake, Ohio, USA, village
 Meyers Place, California (disambiguation), multiple locations
 Meyers Nunatak, in Antarctica

Other uses 
 Meyers Aircraft Company, in USA
 Meyers 200, light aircraft
 Meyers Farm, in the Hanover Zoo, in Hanover, Germany
 Meyers Konversations-Lexikon, German encyclopedia
 Meyers Blitz-Lexikon, a 1924 German print encyclopedia, now in the public domain
 Meyers Manx, dune buggy
 Albertus L. Meyers Bridge, in Allentown, Pennsylvania, USA
 Keith & Meyers Dry Goods Store, original location of the Topeka & Shawnee County Public Library, USA
 Lock 9 Meyers, Trent-Severn Waterway
 Thorvald Meyers gate, main street, Grünerløkka, Oslo, Norway

Common misspellings 
 Bristol-Myers Squibb, an American pharmaceutical corporation
 Liggett and Myers Tobacco Company, an American tobacco company currently known as the Liggett Group
 Myers–Briggs Type Indicator, a personality indicator designed to identify personal preferences

See also 
 Meyers
 Myers (disambiguation)
 Myer (disambiguation)
 Meyr (disambiguation)
 Meyer (disambiguation)
 Meier
 Meir (disambiguation)
 Maier
 Mayer (disambiguation)
 Mair (disambiguation)
 Mayr
 Von Meyer